Addy Brouwers (born 21 January 1946) is a Dutch footballer. He played in one match for the Netherlands national football team in 1969.

References

External links
 

1946 births
Living people
Dutch footballers
Netherlands international footballers
Footballers from Breda
Association football midfielders
NAC Breda players